The 2000 Camp David Summit was a summit meeting at Camp David between United States president Bill Clinton, Israeli prime minister Ehud Barak and Palestinian Authority chairman Yasser Arafat. The summit took place between 11 and 25 July 2000 and was an effort to end the Israeli–Palestinian conflict. The summit ended without an agreement.

Reports of the outcome of the summit have been described as illustrating the Rashomon effect, in which the multiple witnesses gave contradictory and self-serving interpretations.

Summit

U.S. President Bill Clinton announced his invitation to Israeli Prime Minister Ehud Barak and Yasser Arafat on 5 July 2000, to come to Camp David, Maryland, in order to continue their negotiations on the Middle East peace process. There was a hopeful precedent in the 1978 Camp David Accords where President Jimmy Carter was able to broker a peace agreement between Egypt, represented by President Anwar Sadat, and Israel represented by Prime Minister Menachem Begin. The Oslo Accords of 1993 between the later assassinated Israeli Prime Minister Yitzhak Rabin and Palestine Liberation Organization Chairman Yasser Arafat had provided that agreement should be reached on all outstanding issues between the Palestinians and Israeli sides – the so-called final status settlement – within five years of the implementation of Palestinian autonomy. However, the interim process put in place under Oslo had fulfilled neither Israeli nor Palestinian expectations.

On 11 July, the Camp David 2000 Summit convened, although the Palestinians considered the summit premature. They even saw it as a trap. The summit ended on 25 July, without an agreement being reached. At its conclusion, a Trilateral Statement was issued defining the agreed principles to guide future negotiations.

Negotiations

The negotiations were based on an all-or-nothing approach, such that "nothing was considered agreed and binding until everything was agreed." The proposals were, for the most part, verbal. As no agreement was reached and there is no official written record of the proposals, some ambiguity remains over details of the positions of the parties on specific issues.

The talks ultimately failed to reach agreement on the final status issues:

 Territory
 Jerusalem and the Temple Mount
 Refugees and Palestinian right of return
 Security arrangements
 Settlements

Territory
The Palestinian negotiators indicated they wanted full Palestinian sovereignty over the entire West Bank and the Gaza Strip, although they would consider a one-to-one land swap with Israel. Their historic position was that Palestinians had already made a territorial compromise with Israel by accepting Israel's right to 78% of "historic Palestine", and accepting their state on the remaining 22% of such land. This consensus was expressed by Faisal Husseini when he remarked:'There can be no compromise on the compromise'. They maintained that Resolution 242 calls for full Israeli withdrawal from these territories, which were captured in the Six-Day War, as part of a final peace settlement. In the 1993 Oslo Accords the Palestinian negotiators accepted the Green Line borders (1949 armistice lines) for the West Bank but the Israelis rejected this proposal and disputed the Palestinian interpretation of Resolution 242. Israel wanted to annex the numerous settlement blocks on the Palestinian side of the Green Line, and were concerned that a complete return to the 1967 borders was dangerous to Israel's security. The Palestinian and Israeli definition of the West Bank differs by approximately 5% land area as the Israeli definition does not include East Jerusalem (71 km2), the territorial waters of the Dead Sea (195 km2) and the area known as No Man's Land (50 km2 near Latrun).

Based on the Israeli definition of the West Bank, Barak offered to form a Palestinian state initially on 73% of the West Bank (that is, 27% less than the Green Line borders) and 100% of the Gaza Strip. In 10–25 years, the Palestinian state would expand to a maximum of 92% of the West Bank (91 percent of the West Bank and 1 percent from a land swap). From the Palestinian perspective this equated to an offer of a Palestinian state on a maximum of 86% of the West Bank.

According to Robert Wright, Israel would only keep the settlements with large populations. Wright states that all others would be dismantled, with the exception of Kiryat Arba (adjacent to the holy city of Hebron), which would be an Israeli enclave inside the Palestinian state, and would be linked to Israel by a bypass road. The West Bank would be split in the middle by an Israeli-controlled road from Jerusalem to the Dead Sea, with free passage for Palestinians, although Israel reserved the right to close the road to passage in case of emergency. In return, Israel would allow the Palestinians to use a highway in the Negev to connect the West Bank with Gaza. Wright states that in the Israeli proposal, the West Bank and Gaza Strip would be linked by an elevated highway and an elevated railroad running through the Negev, ensuring safe and free passage for Palestinians. These would be under the sovereignty of Israel, and Israel reserved the right to close them to passage in case of emergency.

Israel would retain around 9% in the West Bank in exchange for 1% of land within the Green Line. The land that would be conceded included symbolic and cultural territories such as the Al-Aqsa Mosque, whereas the Israeli land conceded was unspecified. Additional to territorial concessions, Palestinian airspace would be controlled by Israel under Barak's offer. The Palestinians rejected the Halutza Sand region (78 km2) alongside the Gaza Strip as part of the land swap on the basis that it was of inferior quality to that which they would have to give up in the West Bank.

Additional grounds of rejection was that the Israeli proposal planned to annex areas which would lead to a cantonization of the West Bank into three blocs, which the Palestinian delegation likened to South African Bantustans, a loaded word that was disputed by the Israeli and American negotiators. Settlement blocs, bypassed roads and annexed lands would create barriers between Nablus and Jenin with Ramallah. The Ramallah bloc would in turn be divided from Bethlehem and Hebron. A separate and smaller bloc would contain Jericho. Further, the border between West Bank and Jordan would additionally be under Israeli control. The Palestinian Authority would receive pockets of East Jerusalem which would be surrounded entirely by annexed lands in the West Bank.

East Jerusalem
A particularly virulent territorial dispute revolved around the final status of Jerusalem.  Leaders were ill-prepared for the central role the Jerusalem issue in general and the Temple Mount dispute in particular would play in the negotiations. Barak instructed his delegates to treat the dispute as "the central issue that will decide the destiny of the negotiations" whereas Arafat admonished his delegation to "not budge on this one thing:  the Haram (the Temple Mount) is more precious to me than everything else." At the opening of Camp David, Barak warned the Americans he could not accept giving the Palestinians more than a purely symbolic sovereignty over any part of East Jerusalem.

The Palestinians demanded complete sovereignty over East Jerusalem and its holy sites, in particular, the Al-Aqsa Mosque and the Dome of the Rock, which are located on the Temple Mount (Haram al-Sharif), a site holy in both Islam and Judaism, and the dismantling of all Israeli neighborhoods built over the Green Line. The Palestinian position, according to Mahmoud Abbas, at that time Arafat's chief negotiator, was that: "All of East Jerusalem should be returned to Palestinian sovereignty. The Jewish Quarter and Western Wall should be placed under Israeli authority, not Israeli sovereignty. An open city and cooperation on municipal services."

Israel proposed that the Palestinians be granted "custodianship," though not sovereignty, on the Temple Mount (Haram al-Sharif), with Israel retaining control over the Western Wall, a remnant of the ancient wall that surrounded the Temple Mount, the most sacred site in Judaism outside of the Temple Mount itself. Israeli negotiators also proposed that the Palestinians be granted administration of, but not sovereignty over, the Muslim and Christian Quarters of the Old City, with the Jewish and Armenian Quarters remaining in Israeli hands. Palestinians would be granted administrative control over all Islamic and Christian holy sites, and would be allowed to raise the Palestinian flag over them. A passage linking northern Jerusalem to Islamic and Christian holy sites would be annexed by the Palestinian state. The Israeli team proposed annexing to Israeli Jerusalem settlements within the West Bank beyond the Green Line, such as Ma'ale Adumim, Givat Ze'ev, and Gush Etzion. Israel proposed that the Palestinians merge certain outer Arab villages and small cities that had been annexed to Jerusalem just after 1967 (such as Abu Dis, al-Eizariya, 'Anata, A-Ram, and eastern Sawahre) to create the city of Al-Quds, which would serve as the capital of Palestine. The historically important Arab neighborhoods such as Sheikh Jarrah, Silwan and at-Tur would remain under Israeli sovereignty, while Palestinians would only have civilian autonomy. The Palestinians would exercise civil and administrative autonomy in the outer Arab neighborhoods. Israeli neighborhoods within East Jerusalem would remain under Israeli sovereignty. The holy places in the Old City would enjoy independent religious administration. In total, Israel demanded that Palestine's territory in East Jerusalem be reduced to eight sections including six small enclaves according to Palestine's delegation to the summit.
 
Palestinians objected to the lack of sovereignty and to the right of Israel to keep Jewish neighborhoods that it built over the Green Line in East Jerusalem, which the Palestinians claimed block the contiguity of the Arab neighborhoods in East Jerusalem.

Refugees and the right of return

Due to the first Arab-Israeli war, a significant number of Palestinian Arabs fled or were expelled from their homes inside what is now Israel. These refugees numbered approximately 711,000 to 725,000 at the time. Today, they and their descendants number about four million, comprising about half the Palestinian people. Since that time, the Palestinians have demanded full implementation of the right of return, meaning that each refugee would be granted the option of returning to his or her home, with property restored, and receive compensation. Israelis asserted that allowing a right of return to Israel proper, rather than to the newly created Palestinian state, would mean an influx of Palestinians that would fundamentally alter the demographics of Israel, jeopardizing Israel's Jewish character and its existence as a whole.

At Camp David, the Palestinians maintained their traditional demand that the right of return be implemented. They demanded that Israel recognize the right of all refugees who so wished to settle in Israel, but to address Israel's demographic concerns, they promised that the right of return would be implemented via a mechanism agreed upon by both sides, which would try to channel a majority of refugees away from the option of returning to Israel. According to U.S. Secretary of State Madeleine Albright, some of the Palestinian negotiators were willing to privately discuss a limit on the number of refugees who would be allowed to return to Israel. Palestinians who chose to return to Israel would do so gradually, with Israel absorbing 150,000 refugees every year.

The Israeli negotiators denied that Israel was responsible for the refugee problem, and were concerned that any right of return would pose a threat to Israel's Jewish character. In the Israeli proposal, a maximum of 100,000 refugees would be allowed to return to Israel on the basis of humanitarian considerations or family reunification. All other people classified as Palestinian refugees would be settled in their present place of inhabitance, the Palestinian state, or third-party countries. Israel would help fund their resettlement and absorption. An international fund of $30 billion would be set up, which Israel would help contribute to, along with other countries, that would register claims for compensation of property lost by Palestinian refugees and make payments within the limits of its resources.

Security arrangements
The Israeli negotiators proposed that Israel be allowed to set up radar stations inside the Palestinian state, and be allowed to use its airspace. Israel also wanted the right to deploy troops on Palestinian territory in the event of an emergency, and the stationing of an international force in the Jordan Valley. Palestinian authorities would maintain control of border crossings under temporary Israeli observation. Israel would maintain a permanent security presence along 15% of the Palestinian-Jordanian border. Israel also demanded that the Palestinian state be demilitarized with the exception of its paramilitary security forces, that it would not make alliances without Israeli approval or allow the introduction of foreign forces west of the Jordan River, and that it dismantle terrorist groups. One of Israel's strongest demands was that Arafat declare the conflict over, and make no further demands. Israel also wanted water resources in the West Bank to be shared by both sides and remain under Israeli management.

Aftermath

In mid-October, Clinton and the parties held a summit in Sharm El Sheikh, resulting in a "Sharm memorandum" with understandings aimed at ending the violence and renewing security cooperation. From 18 to 23 December they held negotiations, followed by Clinton's presentation of his "parameters", in a last attempt to achieve peace in the Middle East before his second term ended in January 2001. Although the official statements stated that both parties had accepted the Clinton Parameters with reservations, these reservations in fact meant that the parties had rejected the parameters on certain essential points. On 2 January 2001, the Palestinians put forward their acceptance with some fundamental objections. Barak accepted the parameters with a 20-page letter of reservations. A Sharm el-Sheikh summit planned for 28 December did not take place.

Clinton's initiative led to the Taba negotiations in January 2001, where the two sides published a statement saying they had never been closer to agreement (though such issues as Jerusalem, the status of Gaza, and the Palestinian demand for compensation for refugees and their descendants remained unresolved), but Barak, facing elections, re-suspended the talks. Ehud Barak was to be defeated by Ariel Sharon in 2001.

Responsibility for failure

Accusations of Palestinian responsibility
Most of the Israeli and American criticism for the failure of the 2000 Camp David Summit was leveled at Arafat. Ehud Barak portrays Arafat's behavior at Camp David as a "performance geared to exact as many Israeli concessions as possible without ever seriously intending to reach a peace settlement or sign an "end to the conflict.

Clinton blamed Arafat after the failure of the talks, stating, "I regret that in 2000 Arafat missed the opportunity to bring that nation into being and pray for the day when the dreams of the Palestinian people for a state and a better life will be realized in a just and lasting peace." The failure to come to an agreement was widely attributed to Yasser Arafat, as he walked away from the table without making a concrete counter-offer and because Arafat did little to quell the series of Palestinian riots that began shortly after the summit. Arafat was also accused of scuttling the talks by Nabil Amr, a former minister in the Palestinian Authority. In My Life, Clinton wrote that Arafat once complimented Clinton by telling him, "You are a great man." Clinton responded, "I am not a great man. I am a failure, and you made me one."

Dennis Ross, the US Middle East envoy and a key negotiator at the summit, summarized his perspectives in his book The Missing Peace. During a lecture in Australia, Ross suggested that the reason for the failure was Arafat's unwillingness to sign a final deal with Israel that would close the door on any of the Palestinians' maximum demands, particularly the right of return. Ross claimed that what Arafat really wanted was "a one-state solution. Not independent, adjacent Israeli and Palestinian states, but a single Arab state encompassing all of Historic Palestine". Ross also quoted Saudi Prince Bandar as saying while negotiations were taking place: "If Arafat does not accept what is available now, it won't be a tragedy; it will be a crime."

In his book, The Oslo Syndrome, Harvard Medical School professor of psychiatry and historian Kenneth Levin summarized the failure of the 2000 Camp David Summit in this manner: "despite the dimensions of the Israeli offer and intense pressure from President Clinton, Arafat demurred.  He apparently was indeed unwilling, no matter what the Israeli concessions, to sign an agreement that declared itself final and forswore any further Palestinian claims." Levin argues that both the Israelis and the Americans were naive in expecting that Arafat would agree to give up the idea of a literal "right of return" for all Palestinians into Israel proper no matter how many 1948 refugees or how much monetary compensation Israel offered to allow.

Alan Dershowitz, an Israel advocate and a law professor at Harvard University, said that the failure of the negotiations was due to "the refusal of the Palestinians and Arafat to give up the right of return. That was the sticking point.  It wasn't Jerusalem.  It wasn't borders. It was the right of return." He claimed that President Clinton told this to him "directly and personally."

Accusations of Israeli and American responsibility
In 2001 Robert Malley, present at the summit, noted three "myths" that had arisen regarding the failure of the negotiations. Those were "Camp David was an ideal test of Mr. Arafat's intentions", "Israel's offer met most if not all of the Palestinians' legitimate aspirations", and "The Palestinians made no concession of their own" and wrote that "If peace is to be achieved, the parties cannot afford to tolerate the growing acceptance of these myths as reality."

The Israeli group Gush Shalom stated that "the offer is a pretense of generosity for the benefit of the media", and included detailed maps of what the offer specifically entailed. Among Gush Shalom's concerns with Barak's offer were Barak's demand to annex large settlement blocs (9% of the West Bank), lack of trust in the commitment and/or ability of the Israeli government to evacuate the thousands of non-bloc Israeli settlers in the 15-year timeline, and limited sovereignty for Palestinians in Jerusalem.

Clayton Swisher wrote a rebuttal to Clinton and Ross's accounts about the causes for the breakdown of the Camp David Summit in his 2004 book, The Truth About Camp David. Swisher, the Director of Programs at the Middle East Institute, concluded that the Israelis and the Americans were at least as guilty as the Palestinians for the collapse. M.J. Rosenberg praised the book: "Clayton Swisher's 'The Truth About Camp David,' based on interviews with [US negotiators] Martin Indyk, Dennis Ross and [Aaron] Miller himself provides a comprehensive and acute account – the best we're likely to see – on the [one-sided diplomacy] Miller describes."

Shlomo Ben-Ami, then Israel's Minister of Foreign Relations who participated in the talks, stated that the Palestinians wanted the immediate withdrawal of the Israelis from the West Bank, Gaza Strip and East Jerusalem, and only subsequently the Palestinian authority would dismantle the Palestinian organizations. The Israeli response was "we can't accept the demand for a return to the borders of June 1967 as a pre-condition for the negotiation." In 2006, Shlomo Ben-Ami stated on Democracy Now! that "Camp David was not the missed opportunity for the Palestinians, and if I were a Palestinian I would have rejected Camp David, as well. This is something I put in the book. But Taba is the problem. The Clinton parameters are the problem" referring to his 2001 book Scars of War, Wounds of Peace: The Israeli-Arab Tragedy.

Norman Finkelstein published an article in the winter 2007 issue of Journal of Palestine Studies, excerpting from his longer essay called Subordinating Palestinian Rights to Israeli "Needs".  The abstract for the article states: "In particular, it examines the assumptions informing Ross’s account of what happened during the negotiations and why, and the distortions that spring from these assumptions. Judged from the perspective of Palestinians' and Israelis' respective rights under international law, all the concessions at Camp David came from the Palestinian side, none from the Israeli side."

Berkeley political science professor Ron Hassner has argued that it was the failure of participants at the negotiations to include religious leaders in the process or even consult with religious experts prior to the negotiations, that led to the collapse of the negotiations over the subject of Jerusalem.  "Both parties seem to have assumed that the religious dimensions of the dispute could be ignored.  As a result, neither party had prepared seriously for the possibility that the Temple Mount issue would come to stand at the heart of the negotiations." Political Scientist Menahem Klein, who advised the Israeli government during the negotiations, confirmed that "The professional back channels did not sufficiently treat Jerusalem as a religious city... It was easier to conduct discussions about preservation of historical structures in the old city than to discuss the link between the political sanctity and the religious sanctity at the historical and religious heart of the city."

Public opinion towards the summit
The Palestinian public was supportive of Arafat's role in the negotiations. After the summit, Arafat's approval rating increased seven percentage points from 39 to 46%. Overall, 68% of the Palestinian public thought Arafat's positions on a final agreement at Camp David were just right and 14% thought Arafat compromised too much while only 6% thought Arafat had not compromised enough.

Barak did not fare as well in public opinion polls. Only 25% of the Israeli public thought his positions on Camp David were just right as opposed to 58% of the public that thought Barak compromised too much. A majority of Israelis were opposed to Barak's position on every issue discussed at Camp David except for security.

Concluding Trilateral statement (full text)

See also
Mitchell Report (Arab–Israeli conflict)
Proposals for a Palestinian state
Charles Enderlin

References

Bibliography
Ehud Barak. Statement by Prime Minister Barak at Press Conference upon the Conclusion of the Camp David Summit
Shlomo Ben-Ami.  Camp David Diaries.  Excerpts from a 6 April 2001 article in Ma'ariv
Gilead Sher (2006). The Israeli-Palestinian Peace Negotiations, 1999–2001.  Routledge. A first hand account from the chief negotiator for the Israeli team
Mahmoud Abbas, Reports of the Camp David Summit, 9 September 2000 Excerpts published in the Journal of Palestine Studies, vol. XXX, No. 2 (Winter 2001), pp. 168–170
Akram Haniyah, The Camp David Papers, first hand account by a member of the Palestinian negotiating team, originally published in the Palestinian daily al-Ayyam.  English translation in Journal of Palestine Studies, vol. XXX, No. 2 (Winter 2001), pp. 75–97
Madeleine Albright (2003). Madam Secretary: A Memoir. New York: Hyperion (especially chapter 28)
Bill Clinton, My Life: The Presidential Years (especially chapter 25)
Dennis Ross The Missing Peace : The Inside Story of the Fight for Middle East Peace
Kenneth Levin. The Oslo Syndrome: Delusions of a People Under Siege. Hanover: Smith and Kraus, 2005.

Further reading
Bregman, Ahron Elusive Peace: How the Holy Land Defeated America.

External links

General
Principles of Camp David's "American Plan". FMEP, Settlement Report, September–October 2000. American proposals, as reported in Ha'aretz and Yediot Aharanot.
Interview with Dennis Ross about the summit
More recent interview with Dennis Ross about the summit
Several articles on the 2000 summit, including interviews with Clinton and Ben-Ami at the Jewish Virtual Library
Camp David offer according to Palestinian Academic Society for the Study of International Affairs
The Middle East Peace Summit at Camp David- July 2000 Israeli Ministry of Foreign Affairs

Maps
Camp David proposal maps (with explanations) according to MidEastWeb.
Palestinian Maps of the Camp David 2 Proposals.
West Bank Final Status Map Presented By Israel, May 2000 Foundation for Middle East Peace.
 Peres Center for Peace.
 Maps: Israeli proposals, from Camp David (2000) to Taba (2001)
Failed compromise at Camp David. December 2000 English article in Le Monde diplomatique refers to some of the above-linked French-language maps.
 and, Orient House, 2000 
Barak's generous offers. Gush Shalom.

New York Review of Books series
Robert Malley and Hussein Agha. "Camp David: The Tragedy of Errors," New York Review of Books, 9 August 2001
Dennis Ross, Gidi Grinstein, Hussein Agha, Robert Malley. "Camp David: An Exchange." New York Review of Books, 20 September 2001
Camp David and After: An Exchange (1. An Interview with Ehud Barak), by Benny Morris, in response to "Camp David: The Tragedy of Errors") 13 June 2002
Camp David and After: An Exchange (2. A Reply to Ehud Barak) By Hussein Agha, Robert Malley, 13 June 2002
Camp David and After – Continued Benny Morris, Ehud Barak, Reply by Hussein Agha, Robert Malley, 27 June 2002

Views and analysis
Comparing Camp David I and II, Dr. Kenneth W. Stein, Emory University
"Was Arafat the Problem?" by Robert Wright
"Barak: A Villa in the Jungle." Uri Avnery, July 2002
"The Day Barak's Bubble Burst". 15 Sept. 2001 article, by Uri Avnery, a founder of the Israeli peace group Gush Shalom. More of their articles about Camp David are here.
Jerome M. Segal, "The Palestinian Peace Offer," originally published in Ha'aretz, 1 October 2001
Visions in Collision: What Happened at Camp David and Taba? , Dr. Jeremy Pressman, 2003.

Articles containing video clips
Israeli–Palestinian peace process
Israel–United States relations
Middle East peace efforts
2000 conferences
July 2000 events in the United States
2000 in Israel
2000 in the Palestinian territories
Diplomatic conferences in the United States
20th-century diplomatic conferences
2000 in international relations
State of Palestine–United States relations
2000 in Maryland
Yasser Arafat
Presidency of Bill Clinton